A. S. M. Abdur Rab (born 1945) is a Bangladeshi politician. He is the founder secretary general of the Jatiya Samajtantrik Dal. In 1985, Rab and his followers left the party and formed a new party Jatiya Samajtantrik Dal-JSD, known as JSD (Rab). He served as the Jatiya Sangsad Member from Lakshmipur-4 and the Minister of Shipping and later the Minister of Fisheries and Livestock during 1996-2001 of the first Sheikh Hasina Cabinet.

Early life 
Rab was born in 1945. He was general secretary of the student political organization East Pakistan Chhatra League from 1969 to 1970. He was the leader of the 1969 mass uprising in East Pakistan. He was the first person to hoist the Flag of Bangladesh on 2 March 1971 as the vice president of Dhaka University Central Students' Union.

Career 
He is one of the organizers of the liberation struggle of Bangladesh. Under the leadership of Chhatra League leader Noor Alam Siddiqui, Abdul Kuddus, A S M Abdur Rab and Shajahan Siraj, the flag of independent Bangladesh was hoisted in Dhaka University on 2 March 1971. A flag of independent Bangladesh was first inaugurated by ASM Abdur Rab. In the historic Bot-tala of Dhaka University, A S M Abdur Rab handed over the flag of Bangladesh to Sheikh Mujibur Rahman. After the independence of Bangladesh, Rab formed the left-wing Jatiya Samajtantrik Dal (National Socialist Party). He along with Serajul Alam Khan and Shajahan Siraj, took a stand against the government led by Sheikh Mujibur Rahman. He led the rally on 17 March 1974 towards the residence of the Home Minister at Ramna amid Jatiya Rakkhi Bahini led firing upon the crowd. Rab is a survivor of the 1974 Ramna massacre. President Abu Sadat Mohammad Sayem released M. A. Jalil and Rab after taking power because of the involvement of Jatiya Samajtantrik Dal in the coup d'état in November 1975.

Rab became the leader of the opposition in 1988 and also served as a minister of Sheikh Hasina's cabinet from 1996 to 2001 as the Minister of Shipping and later the Minister of Fisheries and Livestock.

References

1945 births
Living people
Recipients of the Bir Uttom
Jatiya Samajtantrik Dal politicians
7th Jatiya Sangsad members
Fisheries and Livestock ministers of Bangladesh
Shipping ministers of Bangladesh
Mukti Bahini personnel
Date of birth missing (living people)
Place of birth missing (living people)
3rd Jatiya Sangsad members
Leaders of the Opposition (Bangladesh)